Ernst Käsemann (12 July 1906 – 17 February 1998) was a German Lutheran theologian and professor of New Testament in Mainz (1946–1951), Göttingen (1951–1959) and Tübingen (1959–1971).

Study and work
Käsemann was born in Bochum. He obtained his PhD in New Testament at the University of Marburg in 1931, having written a dissertation on Pauline ecclesiology, with Rudolf Bultmann as his doctoral supervisor. Käsemann was one of Bultmann's more well-known politically left-of-centre 'pupils'.

Käsemann joined the Confessing Church movement in 1933; in the same year, he was appointed pastor in Gelsenkirchen, in a district populated mainly by miners. During the autumn of 1937 he spent a few weeks in Gestapo detention for publicly supporting communist miners.

During 1939, he completed his habilitation, which qualified him to teach at German universities; his dissertation was on the New Testament Epistle to the Hebrews.

Käsemann was later drafted as a soldier. He returned to his theological work in 1946 after several years in the army and as a prisoner of war.

Käsemann was involved with what is known as the 'New Quest for the historical Jesus', a new phase of scholarly interest in working out what could possibly be ascertained historically about Jesus. Käsemann effectively started this phase when he published his famous article "The Problem of the Historical Jesus" during 1954, originally his inaugural lecture as Professor in Göttingen in 1951.

Käsemann developed what became known as the double criterion of difference in evaluating the historical reliability of the synoptic gospels. Put simply, what is historically reliable about Jesus can be deduced from material about Jesus which is neither plausible in a first-century Jewish nor an early Christian context. In addition to this, he proposed additional criteria, such as multiple attestation (does a particular story or saying of Jesus appear in independent traditions?) and coherence with other material already found to be reliable historical traditions about Jesus. Only the recent 'third quest' for the historical Jesus, which began in the later 1980s, began to question the absolute validity of these criteria.

Käsemann also began to take Jewish apocalypticism more seriously than most of his contemporary colleagues and thought it to be of vital significance for a reading of Paul. Indeed, he famously described apocalypticism as "the mother of Christian theology". Käsemann's commentary on Paul's Epistle to the Romans, first published in 1973, became a standard work for that generation.

His daughter, was abducted by security forces in Argentina during the military dictatorship and subsequently 'disappeared'. It is thought that she was murdered around 24 May 1977. Ernst Käsemann's subsequent theological writings acquired a more radical, often bitter edge after his daughter's murder.

Ernst Käsemann received honorary doctorates from the universities of Marburg, Durham, Edinburgh, Oslo and Yale.

He died on 17 February 1998 in Tübingen.

Books by Ernst Käsemann (in English)
Essays on New Testament themes. London, SCM, 1964.
New Testament questions of today. London, SCM, 1969.
Jesus means freedom: a polemical survey of the New Testament. London, SCM, 1969.
Perspectives on Paul. London, SCM, 1971.
Commentary on Romans. London, SCM, 1980.
The Wandering People of God. Minneapolis, Augsburg, 1984.
On Being a Disciple of the Crucified Nazarene. Grand Rapids, Eerdmans, 2010.

Literature about Ernst Käsemann
Way, D V 1991. The Lordship of Christ: Ernst Käsemann's Interpretation of Paul's Theology. Oxford.
Zahl, Paul F M 1996. Die Rechtfertigungslehre Ernst Käsemanns. Calwer Verlag.
Osborn, E F 1999. Käsemann, Ernst. In: Hayes, J H (ed) Dictionary of Biblical Interpretation Vol. 2, Nashville: Abingdon, pages 14–16.
Harrisville, R A & Sundberg, W. Käsemann, Ernst. In: The Bible in Modern Culture: Theology and Historical Critical Method from Spinoza to Käsemann. Grand Rapids: Eerdmans, pages 238–261.

See also
Rudolf Bultmann
Günther Bornkamm
Michael Lattke
On the Kairos Document

References

External links
Sermon drawing on Käsemann's life and work
Magazine article on Käsemann and the Nazis
Article/obituary in Anglican Theological Review
Information about the murder of Elisabeth Käsemann (in German)

German Lutheran theologians
German biblical scholars
New Testament scholars
1906 births
1998 deaths
University of Marburg alumni
People from Bochum
20th-century German Lutheran clergy
Academic staff of the University of Göttingen
Academic staff of Johannes Gutenberg University Mainz
Academic staff of the University of Tübingen
20th-century German Protestant theologians
German male non-fiction writers
Lutheran biblical scholars